Greg Jones is one of the most successful American collegiate wrestlers of all-time.  At West Virginia University, Jones won three NCAA Division 1 wrestling titles - one of only 39 wrestlers to accomplish that feat in the tournament's 75-year history.

Shortly after his 5-3 decision of Cornell's Tyler Baier in the 184 pound finals, Jones was named the 2005 tournament's Most Outstanding Wrestler.  In addition to his title in 2005, Jones won the 184 pound title in 2004 and the 174 pound title as a freshman in 2002. Jones is currently serving as the Head Wrestling Coach for Sanford MMA in Deerfield Beach FL.

Background 
Greg Jones was born  on August 10, 1982, in Greensburg, Pennsylvania.  He was the third of 5 children.  Greg's older brother Vertus was a 3-time All-American wrestler. Both brothers were inducted into the West Virginia Mountaineers Hall of Fame in 2019.  In Greensburg-Salem School District Jones won the PIAA championship as a member of the Greensburg-Salem Golden Lions wrestling team and was a two-time state champion. Greg went on to win three national championships as a member of the West Virginia University Mountaineers. He set his high school's record for career wins. Despite not playing football in college, Jones worked out for the Pittsburgh Steelers of the National Football League prior to the 2005 NFL Draft.

Coaching
Jones went on to coach for the Mountaineer wrestling team for 9 years until he was offered a head coach wrestling position. At Blackzilians since the summer of 2014, Jones has been one of the top wrestling coaches in MMA training top contenders the likes of Anthony Johnson, Rashad Evans, Michael Johnson, and Eddie Alvarez to name a few.

Suspension
In late 2020, Jones and Henri Hooft were suspended for three months after they broke COVID-19 protocols by leaving their hotel rooms while quarantining preceding Bellator 253.

Noteworthy statistics 

 One of 39 3-time NCAA champions
 One of 20 wrestlers to win titles at two weights
 One of 10 wrestlers to win a national title as a freshman
 126-4 career record
 His only losses were to Otto Olson of Michigan (9-8), Ralph Everett (3-2 t.b.), and Rashad Evans of Michigan State (3-2).  The fourth loss was a forfeit.
 West Virginia's all-time wins leader
 Undefeated his junior and senior years
 Ended career with a 51-match win streak
 4-time Eastern Wrestling League (EWL) champion
 First EWL wrestler to be named Most Outstanding Wrestler at the NCAA tournament
 Was taken down just ten times in his career. Twice by Tom Meester of Augustana College. 
 Outscored opponents 298-82 his senior year
 Voted 2004 West Virginia Amateur Athlete of the Year
 17-2 record in 4 NCAA tournaments
 Member of the Eastern Wrestling League and NWCA All-Academic Teams
 Inducted into the West Virginia Mountaineers Hall of Fame with the Class of 2019 along with his brother Vertus Jones

External links 
 Article on Greg Jones' Induction into West Virginia University's Hall of Fame
 West Virginia University Hall of Fame Entry
 Greg Jones: All in the Family

References

1982 births
Living people
American male sport wrestlers
Sportspeople from Pennsylvania
West Virginia Mountaineers wrestlers